The following is a list of football stadiums in Kuwait, ordered by capacity.

See also
List of Asian stadiums by capacity
List of association football stadiums by capacity

 
Kuwait
Football stadiums
Football stadiums